Channel Rock was a big rock in the midst of Kowloon Bay, in the east Victoria Harbour, Hong Kong, opposite Kwun Tong Ferry Pier. It was incorporated into the extension of the runway of Kai Tak Airport. A navigation light was built on the rock in 1921, but was demolished with the extension of the Kai Tak runway.

A 1977 survey of molluscs identified at Channel Rock included Siphonaria corallina, Patelloida toloensis, and Collisella cellanica.

References 

Kowloon City District